Hanwood railway station was a station in Hanwood, Shropshire, England. The station was opened in 1861 and closed to passengers in 1960, and to goods traffic in 1964.

Proposed reopening
In 2015, the Shrewsbury and Aberystwyth Rail Passenger Association released an aims document that mentions the possibility of reopening the station, along with Bow Street and Carno stations.

References

Further reading

Disused railway stations in Shropshire
Railway stations in Great Britain opened in 1861
Railway stations in Great Britain closed in 1960
Former Great Western Railway stations
Former London and North Western Railway stations